Lauren Handel Zander was born on February 3, 1970. She is a life coach and is the author of Maybe It's You: Cut the Crap. Face Your Fears. Love Your Life..

In the early 2000s, Zander created The Handel Method, a coaching methodology that has been taught in over 35 major universities and institutes of learning including Massachusetts Institute of Technology, Stanford Graduate School of Business, Stanford Medical School, New York University, Columbia University, Yale School of Drama, Wesleyan University, Fordham University, Rutgers University, Middlebury College, Scripps Research Institute, and in the New York City public school system.

Zander is the Co-Founder and Chairwoman of Handel Group, an international corporate consulting and private coaching company based in New York City.

Education 
Zander graduated from George Washington University in 1994 with a bachelor's degree in environmental studies.

Career 
Zander co-founded Handel Group in 2004 with her sister, Beth Weissenberger. In 2006, Zander began teaching a course based on The Handel Method to students, staff, and alumni at the Massachusetts Institute of Technology.

In 2010, Zander starred in a television special Celebrity Life Coach on A&E Biography with actress Sean Young.

In 2011, Zander presented her coaching methodology at the TEDx Women’s Conference in Amsterdam and was a moderator running the roundtable for the White House's Office of Social Innovation and Civic Participation at Stanford University.

In 2014, Zander appeared on the Dr. Oz show to discuss sustainable weight loss and how women can achieve their goals.

Internationally, the Handel Method was taught for the first time in October 2015 in the CEMS Program at Vienna University of Economics and Business.

Zander's first book, Maybe It's You: Cut the Crap, Face your Fears, Love Your Life was published by Hachette Book Group in 2017.

Contributions 
Zander is a regular contributor to media outlets, including The New York Times, Forbes Self, Women’s Health, Business Insider, Mind Body Green, and The Huffington Post.

In 2011, Zander co-authored an article in the Harvard Business Review with Deborah H. Gruenfeld titled "Authentic Leadership Can Be Bad Leadership". That same year, she was featured in a documentary 'How to Succeed in Business Draper Style' that looked at the effective creative and leadership qualities of the character, Donald Draper in the television series, Mad Men

In 2017, Zander participated as a contributor to a piece on work-life balance for working mothers in Self.

References 

1970 births
Living people
George Washington University alumni
Life coaches